Twin Valley USD 240 is a public unified school district headquartered in Bennington, Kansas, United States.  The district includes the communities of Bennington, Culver, Tescott, Glendale, and nearby rural areas.

Schools
The school district operates the following schools:
 Bennington Junior/Senior High School
 Bennington Grade School
 Tescott Junior/Senior High School
 Tescott Grade School

See also
 Kansas State Department of Education
 Kansas State High School Activities Association
 List of high schools in Kansas
 List of unified school districts in Kansas

References

External links
 

School districts in Kansas